Agnesia is a genus of herbaceous South American bamboo in the grass family.

It is named in honor of agrostologist (botanical specialist in the area of grasses) Mary Agnes Chase (1869-1963).

The only known species is Agnesia lancifolia, native to lowland tropical rainforests of Brazil, Colombia and Peru.

Agnesia lancifolia is perennial herb with 7-10 stems per clump, each up to 50 cm tall. Lower leaves lacking blades or with blades less than 5 mm long; upper leaves with blades up to 16 cm long. Each stem has 1-6 racemes at the tips of the culm or from the axils of the upper leaves, pistillate (female) and staminate (male) flowers in different spikelets on the same plant.

See also 
 List of Poaceae genera

References 

Bambusoideae genera
Monotypic Poaceae genera
Flora of the Amazon
Bambusoideae